Princess Sukeko (亮子内親王; 1147 – 27 April 1216), later Inpumon'in (殷富門院), was a princess and an Empress of Japan. Sukeko was empress as the Honorary Mother (准母) of her nephews Emperor Antoku and Emperor Go-Toba.

Life
She was the daughter of Emperor Go-Shirakawa and Lady-in-Waiting Fujiwara Shigeko, and the sister of Emperor Takakura. She was appointed Honorary Mother to her nephews, who reigned in succession as Emperor Antoku and Emperor Go-Toba. As their Honorary Mother, she was Honorary Empress and performed the court functions of the position of Empress during their reign.

Notes

Japanese princesses
Japanese empresses
1147 births
1216 deaths
Saigū
Daughters of emperors